Rigoberto Mendoza (born 6 July 1992) is a Dominican professional basketball player for the Capitanes de Ciudad de México of the NBA G League.

Professional career
Mendoza debuted in the Dominican league, where he played for Reales de La Vega. Later, he further gained experience in Spanish, Puerto Rican and Argentine basketball.

He joined Capitanes de Ciudad de México of the Liga Nacional de Baloncesto Profesional for the 2017–2018 season, the first in franchise history. His impact was felt immediately as he averaged 15.7 points, as well as 2.8 assists per game.
In his second season he stepped forward and improved in every aspect of the game, as his team's leader at the guard position. He maintained his 15 points and raised his assist average. He also stayed close to five rebounds per game.
In 2018–19, Mendoza had a stellar season and helped his team achieve 27 victories. He eventually became league's Most Valuable Player, despite not leading any of the statistical sections of the LNBP.
In the postseason, he led his team to the second final in team history.

Mendoza began the 2020-21 season with Dorados de Chihuahua, averaging 12 points and 4 assists per game. On November 17, 2020, Mendoza signed with Maccabi Haifa of the Israeli Basketball Premier League.

On November 5, 2021, Mendoza signed with the Capitanes de Ciudad de México of the NBA G League.

On January 19, 2022, Mendoza signed with Real Estelí of the Liga Superior de Baloncesto.

National team
Mendoza has played for the Dominican Republic national basketball team on many occasions. At the 2019 FIBA World Cup in China, he was one of the cornerstones of the team that surprisingly beat Germany and advanced to the second round instead of the heavily favored competitor.

References

External links
Profile at RealGM.com
Profile at 2019 Basketball World Cup
Profile at Eurobasket.com

1992 births
Living people
Guards (basketball)
Capitanes de Ciudad de México players
Dominican Republic expatriate basketball people in Argentina
Dominican Republic expatriate basketball people in Israel
Dominican Republic expatriate basketball people in Mexico
Dominican Republic expatriate basketball people in Puerto Rico
Dominican Republic expatriate basketball people in Spain
Dominican Republic men's basketball players
Estudiantes Concordia basketball players
Santeros de Aguada basketball players
People from San Cristóbal, Dominican Republic
Astros de Jalisco players
Dorados de Chihuahua (LNBP) players